A gribble is a marine isopod from the family Limnoriidae.

Gribble may also be a family name of British origins.

Notable persons
Bernard Gribble (1927–2004), British film editor
B. F. Gribble (1872–1962), British marine artist
David Gribble, Australian cinematographer
Di Gribble (1942–2011), Australian publisher
Eleanor Gribble (1883–1960), English artist
Ernest Gribble (1868–1957), Australian missionary
J. B. Gribble (1847–1893), Australian missionary, father of Ernest
Julian Royds Gribble (1897–1918), English Victoria Cross recipient
Mark Gribble (born 1969), English cricketer
Matt Gribble (1962–2004), American Olympic swimmer
Timothy Gribble (1963–2000), American murderer and suspected serial killer
Vivien Gribble (1888–1932), British wood engraver

Fictional characters
Dale Gribble, fictional character from the animated series King of the Hill
Gabrielle Gribble, minor character in the novel The Worst Witch

See also
Greeble
Scraps, a food known as gribbles in the south west of England